Nancy Xu YouJie (born 30 July 1991) is a Chinese dancer and choreographer. She is best known for being a professional dancer on Strictly Come Dancing since 2019.

Early and personal life
Xu was born on 30 July 1991 in Hunan, China. She began dancing at the age of 8 and attended the Guangzhou Dancing School.

Xu is dating bodyguard Mikee Michele, who is also a martial arts expert and choreographer.

Career
Xu specialises in Latin dance and was a finalist in the U21 World Championships in 2010, she finished in third place in the 2010-2012 CBDF National Amateur Latin Championships and was runner-up at the 2013 International Singapore Championship.

Xu appeared on the Chinese version of So You Think You Can Dance in 2014, where she reached the finals. In 2015, she joined the dance company Burn the Floor and performed around the world.

Strictly Come Dancing
On 30 July 2019, her 28th birthday, Xu was announced as a new professional dancer joining the seventeenth series of Strictly Come Dancing. Xu did not partner a celebrity and instead appeared in the professional group dances throughout the series. Xu was however partnered with EastEnders actor Rudolph Walker for the 2019 Children in Need special where they danced a group Cha-Cha-Cha. Xu returned as a professional for the eighteenth series however was not paired up with a celebrity for the second time and remained part of the dance troupe.

Xu was given a partner for the first time in the nineteenth series when she was paired up with CBBC presenter Rhys Stephenson. The couple were eliminated in the semi-final, coming 4th in the competition. The couple had topped the leader-board twice, once with the Charleston and once with the Argentine tango, but were also in the dance-off four times.

For the twentieth series she was partnered with actor Will Mellor. The couple made it to the semi-final, topping the leaderboard three times in the process, but were eliminated and finished in 5th place.

Series 19: with celebrity partner Rhys Stephenson

  number indicates that Rhys and Nancy were at the top of the leaderboard.
  number indicates that Rhys and Nancy were at the bottom of the leaderboard.
 *Score awarded by guest judge Cynthia Erivo.

Series 20: with celebrity partner Will Mellor

  number indicates that Will and Nancy were at the top of the leaderboard.

References 

Living people
1991 births
Chinese female dancers
People from Hunan